The Septuagint, sometimes referred to as the Greek Old Testament or The Translation of the Seventy, and often abbreviated as LXX, is the earliest extant Greek translation of the Hebrew Bible from the original Hebrew. The full Greek title derives from the story recorded in the Letter of Aristeas to Philocrates that "the laws of the Jews" were translated into the Greek language at the request of Ptolemy II Philadelphus (285–247 BC) by seventy-two Jewish translators—six from each of the Twelve Tribes of Israel.

Biblical scholars agree that the first five books of the Hebrew Bible were translated from Biblical Hebrew into Koine Greek by Jews living in the Ptolemaic Kingdom, probably in the early or middle part of the third century BCE. The remaining books were presumably translated in the 2nd century BCE. Some targumim translating or paraphrasing the Bible into Aramaic were also made during the Second Temple period.

Few people could speak and even fewer could read in the Hebrew language during the Second Temple period; Koine Greek and Aramaic were the most widely spoken languages at that time among the Jewish community. The Septuagint therefore satisfied a need in the Jewish community.

Some scholars claim that the Septuagint includes only the books of the Pentateuch, while others claim it includes all twenty-four books of the Tanakh (5 books of the Torah, 8 books of the Nevi'im, and 11 books of the Ketuvim). Still others claim that the Septuagint includes not only all of the books of the Tanakh, but also several books (such as the Book of Tobit, the Books of the Maccabees, and the Book of Sirach) which are not recognized in the official Jewish canon. Modern critical editions of the Greek Old Testament are based on the Codices Alexandrinus, Sinaiticus, and Vaticanus. There are important differences among these three versions. For example, the Codex Alexandrinus contains all four books of the Maccabees, the Codex Sinaiticus contains only 1 and 4 Maccabees, and the Codex Vaticanus contains none of the four books.

Etymology
The term "Septuagint" is derived from the Latin phrase Vetus Testamentum ex versione Septuaginta Interpretum ("The Old Testament from the version of the Seventy Translators"). It was not until the time of Augustine of Hippo (354–430 CE) that the Greek translation of the Jewish scriptures was called by the Latin term Septuaginta.

Composition

Jewish legend

According to tradition, Ptolemy II Philadelphus (the Greek Pharaoh of Egypt) sent seventy-two Jewish translators—six from each of the Twelve Tribes of Israel—from Jerusalem to Alexandria to translate the Tanakh from Biblical Hebrew into Koine Greek, for inclusion in his library. This narrative is found in the pseudepigraphic Letter of Aristeas to his brother Philocrates, and is repeated by Philo of Alexandria, Josephus (in Antiquities of the Jews), and by later sources (including Augustine of Hippo). It is also found in the Tractate Megillah of the Babylonian Talmud:

Philo of Alexandria writes that the number of scholars was chosen by selecting six scholars from each of the twelve tribes of Israel. One might think that caution is needed here regarding the accuracy of this statement by Philo of Alexandria, as it could seem to imply the ongoing existence of the twelve tribes as such during King Ptolemy's reign, and that the Ten Lost Tribes of the twelve tribes had not been forcibly resettled by Assyria almost 500 years previously.  

However, it has been noted that numerous refugees from the northern Kingdom of Israel (the homeland of the Ten Lost Tribes) made it into the territory of the southern Kingdom of Judah before the Assyrian victory.  Since they were not taken into captivity, and since tribal affiliation, being passed from father to son, is patrilineal, it is conceivable that many of the descendants of refugees from the Northern Kingdom would still have known the tribes to which they belonged, even at the time of King Ptolemy. It could thus have been from this remnant of the otherwise "lost" Ten Tribes that King Ptolemy acquired the other 60 sages needed for the translation.  According to later rabbinic tradition (which considered the Greek translation as a distortion of sacred text and unsuitable for use in the synagogue), the Septuagint was given to Ptolemy two days before the annual Tenth of Tevet fast.

According to Aristobulus of Alexandria's fragment 3, portions of the Law were translated from Hebrew into Greek long before the well-known Septuagint version. He stated that Plato and Pythagoras knew the Jewish Law and borrowed from it.

In the preface to his 1844 translation of the Septuagint, Lancelot Charles Lee Brenton acknowledges that the Jews of Alexandria were likely to have been the writers of the Septuagint, but dismisses Aristeas' account as a pious fiction. Instead, he asserts that the real origin of the name "Septuagint" pertains to the fact that the earliest version was forwarded by the authors to the Jewish Sanhedrin at Alexandria for editing and approval.

History
The 3rd century BCE is supported for the translation of the Pentateuch by a number of factors, including its Greek being representative of early Koine Greek, citations beginning as early as the 2nd century BCE, and early manuscripts datable to the 2nd century BCE. After the Torah, other books were translated over the next two to three centuries. It is unclear which was translated when, or where; some may have been translated twice (into different versions), and then revised. The quality and style of the translators varied considerably from book to book, from a literal translation to paraphrasing to an interpretative style.

The translation process of the Septuagint and from the Septuagint into other versions can be divided into several stages: the Greek text was produced within the social environment of Hellenistic Judaism, and completed by 132 BCE. With the spread of Early Christianity, this Septuagint in turn was rendered into Latin in a variety of versions and the latter, collectively known as the Vetus Latina, were also referred to as the Septuagint initially in Alexandria but elsewhere as well. The Septuagint also formed the basis for the Slavonic, Syriac, Old Armenian, Old Georgian, and Coptic versions of the Christian Old Testament.

Language
The Septuagint is written in Koine Greek. Some sections contain Semiticisms, which are idioms and phrases based on Semitic languages such as Hebrew and Aramaic. Other books, such as Daniel and Proverbs, have a stronger Greek influence.

The Septuagint may also clarify pronunciation of pre-Masoretic Hebrew; many proper nouns are spelled with Greek vowels in the translation, but contemporary Hebrew texts lacked vowel pointing. However, it is unlikely that all Biblical Hebrew sounds had precise Greek equivalents.

Canonical differences
The Septuagint does not consist of a single, unified corpus. Rather, it is a collection of ancient translations of the Tanakh, along with other Jewish texts that are now commonly referred to as apocrypha. Importantly, the canon of the Hebrew Bible was evolving over the century or so in which the Septuagint was being written. Also, the texts were translated by many different people, in different locations, at different times, for different purposes, and often from different original Hebrew manuscripts.

The Hebrew Bible, also called the Tanakh, has three parts: the Torah ("Law"), the Nevi'im ("Prophets"), and the Ketuvim ("Writings"). The Septuagint has four: law, history, poetry, and prophets. The books of the Apocrypha were inserted at appropriate locations. Extant copies of the Septuagint, which date from the 4th century CE, contain books and additions not present in the Hebrew Bible as established in the Jewish canon and are not uniform in their contents. According to some scholars, there is no evidence that the Septuagint included these additional books. These copies of the Septuagint include books known as anagignoskomena in Greek and in English as deuterocanon (derived from the Greek words for "second canon"), books not included in the Jewish canon. These books are estimated to have been written between 200 BCE and 50 CE. Among them are the first two books of Maccabees; Tobit; Judith; the Wisdom of Solomon; Sirach; Baruch (including the Letter of Jeremiah), and additions to Esther and Daniel. The Septuagint version of some books, such as Daniel and Esther, are longer than those in the Masoretic Text, which were affirmed as canonical in Rabbinic Judaism. The Septuagint Book of Jeremiah is shorter than the Masoretic Text. The Psalms of Solomon, 3 Maccabees, 4 Maccabees, the Letter of Jeremiah, the Book of Odes, the Prayer of Manasseh and Psalm 151 are included in some copies of the Septuagint.

While the Septuagint appears to have been widely accepted by Jews of the Second Temple period, it has been largely rejected as scriptural by mainstream Rabbinic Judaism since late antiquity for several reasons. First, the Septuagint differs from the Hebrew source texts in many cases (particularly in the Book of Job). Second, the translations appear at times to demonstrate an ignorance of Hebrew idiomatic usage. Finally, the rabbis also wanted to distinguish their tradition from the emerging tradition of Christianity, which relied heavily on the Septuagint.

The Septuagint became synonymous with the Greek Old Testament, a Christian canon incorporating the books of the Hebrew canon with additional texts. Although the Catholic Church and the Eastern Orthodox Church include most of the books in the Septuagint in their canons, Protestant churches usually do not. After the Reformation, many Protestant Bibles began to follow the Jewish canon and exclude the additional texts (which came to be called the Apocrypha) as noncanonical. The Apocrypha are included under a separate heading in the King James Version of the Bible.

Final form
All the books in Western Old Testament biblical canons are found in the Septuagint, although the order does not always coincide with the Western book order. The Septuagint order is evident in the earliest Christian Bibles, which were written during the fourth century.

Some books which are set apart in the Masoretic Text are grouped together. The Books of Samuel and the Books of Kings are one four-part book entitled  (Of Reigns) in the Septuagint. The Books of Chronicles, known collectively as Παραλειπομένων (Of Things Left Out) supplement Reigns. The Septuagint organizes the minor prophets in its twelve-part Book of Twelve.

Some ancient scriptures are found in the Septuagint, but not in the Hebrew Bible. The additional books are Tobit; Judith; the Wisdom of Solomon; Wisdom of Jesus son of Sirach; Baruch and the Letter of Jeremiah, which became chapter six of Baruch in the Vulgate; additions to Daniel (The Prayer of Azarias, the Song of the Three Children, Susanna, and Bel and the Dragon); additions to Esther; 1 Maccabees; 2 Maccabees; 3 Maccabees; 4 Maccabees; 1 Esdras; Odes (including the Prayer of Manasseh); the Psalms of Solomon, and Psalm 151.

Fragments of deuterocanonical books in Hebrew are among the Dead Sea Scrolls found at Qumran. Sirach, whose text in Hebrew was already known from the Cairo Geniza, has been found in two scrolls (2QSir or 2Q18, 11QPs_a or 11Q5) in Hebrew. Another Hebrew scroll of Sirach has been found in Masada (MasSir). Five fragments from the Book of Tobit have been found in Qumran: four written in Aramaic and one written in Hebrew (papyri 4Q, nos. 196-200). Psalm 151 appears with a number of canonical and non-canonical psalms in the Dead Sea scroll 11QPs(a) (also known as 11Q5), a first-century-CE scroll discovered in 1956. The scroll contains two short Hebrew psalms, which scholars agree were the basis for Psalm 151. The canonical acceptance of these books varies by Christian tradition.

Theodotion's translation
The Book of Daniel is preserved in the 12-chapter Masoretic Text and in two longer Greek versions, the original Septuagint version, c. 100 BCE, and the later Theodotion version from c. 2nd century CE. Both Greek texts contain three additions to Daniel: The Prayer of Azariah and Song of the Three Holy Children; the story of Susannah and the Elders; and the story of Bel and the Dragon. Theodotion is much closer to the Masoretic Text and became so popular that it replaced the original Septuagint version in all but two manuscripts of the Septuagint itself. The Greek additions were apparently never part of the Hebrew text. Several Old Greek texts of the Book of Daniel have been discovered, and the original form of the book is being reconstructed.

Use

Jewish use

It is unclear to what extent Alexandrian Jews accepted the authority of the Septuagint. Manuscripts of the Septuagint have been found among the Dead Sea Scrolls, and were thought to have been in use among various Jewish sects at the time.

Several factors led most Jews to abandon the Septuagint around the second century CE. The earliest gentile Christians used the Septuagint out of necessity, since it was the only Greek version of the Bible and most (if not all) of these early non-Jewish Christians could not read Hebrew. The association of the Septuagint with a rival religion may have made it suspect in the eyes of the newer generation of Jews and Jewish scholars. Jews instead used Hebrew or Aramaic Targum manuscripts later compiled by the Masoretes and authoritative Aramaic translations, such as those of Onkelos and Rabbi Yonathan ben Uziel.

Perhaps most significant for the Septuagint, as distinct from other Greek versions, was that the Septuagint began to lose Jewish sanction after differences between it and contemporary Hebrew scriptures were discovered. Even Greek-speaking Jews tended to prefer other Jewish versions in Greek (such as the translation by Aquila), which seemed to be more concordant with contemporary Hebrew texts.

Christian use

The Early Christian church used the Greek texts, since Greek was a lingua franca of the Roman Empire at the time and the language of the Greco-Roman Church, while Aramaic was the language of Syriac Christianity.
The relationship between the apostolic use of the Septuagint and the Hebrew texts is complicated. Although the Septuagint seems to have been a major source for the Apostles, it is not the only one. St. Jerome offered, for example, Matthew 2:15 and 2:23, John 19:3, John 7:38, and 1 Corinthians 2:9 as examples found in Hebrew texts but not in the Septuagint. Matthew 2:23 is not present in current Masoretic tradition either; according to Jerome, however, it was in Isaiah 11:1. The New Testament writers freely used the Greek translation when citing the Jewish scriptures (or quoting Jesus doing so), implying that Jesus, his apostles, and their followers considered it reliable.

In the early Christian Church, the presumption that the Septuagint was translated by Jews before the time of Christ and that it lends itself more to a Christological interpretation than 2nd-century Hebrew texts in certain places was taken as evidence that "Jews" had changed the Hebrew text in a way that made it less Christological. Irenaeus writes about Isaiah 7:14 that the Septuagint clearly identifies a "virgin" (Greek παρθένος; bethulah in Hebrew) who would conceive. The word almah in the Hebrew text was, according to Irenaeus, interpreted by Theodotion and Aquila (Jewish converts), as a "young woman" who would conceive. Again according to Irenaeus, the Ebionites used this to claim that Joseph was the biological father of Jesus. To him that was heresy facilitated by late anti-Christian alterations of the scripture in Hebrew, as evident by the older, pre-Christian Septuagint.

Jerome broke with church tradition, translating most of the Old Testament of his Vulgate from Hebrew rather than Greek. His choice was sharply criticized by Augustine, his contemporary. Although Jerome argued for the superiority of the Hebrew texts in correcting the Septuagint on philological and theological grounds, because he was accused of heresy he also acknowledged the Septuagint texts. Acceptance of Jerome's version increased, and it displaced the Septuagint's Old Latin translations.

The Eastern Orthodox Church prefers to use the Septuagint as the basis for translating the Old Testament into other languages, and uses the untranslated Septuagint where Greek is the liturgical language. Critical translations of the Old Testament which use the Masoretic Text as their basis consult the Septuagint and other versions to reconstruct the meaning of the Hebrew text when it is unclear, corrupted, or ambiguous. According to the New Jerusalem Bible foreword, "Only when this (the Masoretic Text) presents insuperable difficulties have emendations or other versions, such as the [...] LXX, been used." The translator's preface to the New International Version reads, "The translators also consulted the more important early versions (including) the Septuagint [...] Readings from these versions were occasionally followed where the MT seemed doubtful"

Textual history

Textual analysis

Modern scholarship holds that the Septuagint was written from the 3rd through the 1st centuries BCE, but nearly all attempts at dating specific books (except for the Pentateuch, early- to mid-3rd century BCE) are tentative. Later Jewish revisions and recensions of the Greek against the Hebrew are well-attested. The best-known are Aquila (128 CE), Symmachus, and Theodotion. These three, to varying degrees, are more-literal renderings of their contemporary Hebrew scriptures compared to the Old Greek (the original Septuagint). Modern scholars consider one (or more) of the three to be new Greek versions of the Hebrew Bible.

Although much of Origen's Hexapla (a six-version critical edition of the Hebrew Bible) is lost, several compilations of fragments are available. Origen kept a column for the Old Greek (the Septuagint), which included readings from all the Greek versions in a critical apparatus with diacritical marks indicating to which version each line (Gr. στίχος) belonged. Perhaps the Hexapla was never copied in its entirety, but Origen's combined text was copied frequently (eventually without the editing marks) and the older uncombined text of the Septuagint was neglected. The combined text was the first major Christian recension of the Septuagint, often called the Hexaplar recension. Two other major recensions were identified in the century following Origen by Jerome, who attributed these to Lucian (the Lucianic, or Antiochene, recension) and Hesychius (the Hesychian, or Alexandrian, recension).

Manuscripts

The oldest manuscripts of the Septuagint include 2nd-century-BCE fragments of Leviticus and Deuteronomy (Rahlfs nos. 801, 819, and 957) and 1st-century-BCE fragments of Genesis, Exodus, Leviticus, Numbers, Deuteronomy, and the Twelve Minor Prophets (Alfred Rahlfs nos. 802, 803, 805, 848, 942, and 943). Relatively-complete manuscripts of the Septuagint postdate the Hexaplar recension, and include the fourth-century-CE Codex Vaticanus and the fifth-century Codex Alexandrinus. These are the oldest-surviving nearly-complete manuscripts of the Old Testament in any language; the oldest extant complete Hebrew texts date to about 600 years later, from the first half of the 10th century. The 4th-century Codex Sinaiticus also partially survives, with many Old Testament texts. The Jewish (and, later, Christian) revisions and recensions are largely responsible for the divergence of the codices. The Codex Marchalianus is another notable manuscript.

Differences from the Vulgate and the Masoretic Text
The text of the Septuagint is generally close to that of the Masoretes and Vulgate. Genesis 4:1–6 is identical in the Septuagint, Vulgate and the Masoretic Text, and Genesis 4:8 to the end of the chapter is the same. There is only one noticeable difference in that chapter, at 4:7:

The differences between the Septuagint and the MT fall into four categories:
 Different Hebrew sources for the MT and the Septuagint. Evidence of this can be found throughout the Old Testament. A subtle example may be found in Isaiah 36:11; the meaning remains the same, but the choice of words evidences a different text. The MT reads "...al tedaber yehudit be-'ozne ha`am al ha-homa" [speak not the Judean language in the ears of (or—which can be heard by) the people on the wall]. The same verse in the Septuagint reads, according to the translation of Brenton: "and speak not to us in the Jewish tongue: and wherefore speakest thou in the ears of the men on the wall." The MT reads "people" where the Septuagint reads "men". This difference is very minor and does not affect the meaning of the verse. Scholars had used discrepancies such as this to claim that the Septuagint was a poor translation of the Hebrew original. This verse is found in Qumran (1QIsaa), however, where the Hebrew word "haanashim" (the men) is found in place of "haam" (the people). This discovery, and others like it, showed that even seemingly-minor differences of translation could be the result of variant Hebrew source texts.
 Differences in interpretation stemming from the same Hebrew text. An example is Genesis 4:7, shown above.
 Differences as a result of idiomatic translation issues: A Hebrew idiom may not be easily translated into Greek, and some difference is imparted. In Psalm 47:10, the MT reads: "The shields of the earth belong to God"; the Septuagint reads, "To God are the mighty ones of the earth."
 Transmission changes in Hebrew or Greek: Revision or recension changes and copying errors

Dead Sea Scrolls
The Biblical manuscripts found in Qumran, commonly known as the Dead Sea Scrolls (DSS), have prompted comparisons of the texts associated with the Hebrew Bible (including the Septuagint). Emanuel Tov, editor of the translated scrolls, identifies five broad variants of DSS texts:
 Proto-Masoretic: A stable text and numerous, distinct agreements with the Masoretic Text. About 60 percent of the Biblical scrolls (including 1QIsa-b) are in this category.
 Pre-Septuagint: Manuscripts which have distinctive affinities with the Greek Bible. About five percent of the Biblical scrolls, they include 4QDeut-q, 4QSam-a, 4QJer-b, and 4QJer-d. In addition to these manuscripts, several others share similarities with the Septuagint but do not fall into this category.
 The Qumran "Living Bible": Manuscripts which, according to Tov, were copied in accordance with the "Qumran practice": distinctive, long orthography and morphology, frequent errors and corrections, and a free approach to the text. They make up about 20 percent of the Biblical corpus, including the Isaiah Scroll (1QIsa-a).
 Pre-Samaritan: DSS manuscripts which reflect the textual form of the Samaritan Pentateuch, although the Samaritan Bible is later and contains information not found in these earlier scrolls, (such as God's holy mountain at Shechem, rather than Jerusalem). These manuscripts, characterized by orthographic corrections and harmonizations with parallel texts elsewhere in the Pentateuch, are about five percent of the Biblical scrolls and include 4QpaleoExod-m.
 Non-aligned: No consistent alignment with any of the other four text types. About 10 percent of the Biblical scrolls, they include 4QDeut-b, 4QDeut-c, 4QDeut-h, 4QIsa-c, and 4QDan-a.

The textual sources present a variety of readings; Bastiaan Van Elderen compares three variations of Deuteronomy 32:43, the Song of Moses:

Print editions
The text of all print editions is derived from the recensions of Origen, Lucian, or Hesychius:
 The editio princeps is the Complutensian Polyglot Bible. Based on now-lost manuscripts, it is one of the received texts used for the KJV (similar to Textus Receptus) and seems to convey quite early readings.
 The  by Brian Walton is one of the few versions that includes a Septuagint not based on the Egyptian Alexandria-type text (such as Vaticanus, Alexandrinus and Sinaiticus), but follows the majority which agree (like the Complutensian Polyglot).
 The Aldine edition (begun by Aldus Manutius) was published in Venice in 1518. The editor says that he collated ancient, unspecified manuscripts, and it has been reprinted several times.
 The Roman or Sixtine Septuagint, which uses Codex Vaticanus as the base text and later manuscripts for the lacunae in the uncial manuscript. It was published in 1587 under the direction of Antonio Carafa, with the help of Roman scholars Gugliemo Sirleto, Antonio Agelli and Petrus Morinus and by the authority of Sixtus V, to assist revisers preparing the Latin Vulgate edition ordered by the Council of Trent. It is the textus receptus of the Greek Old Testament and has been published in a number of editions, such as: those of Robert Holmes and James Parsons (Oxford, 1798–1827), the seven editions of Constantin von Tischendorf which appeared at Leipzig between 1850 and 1887 (the last two published after the death of the author and revised by Nestle), and the four editions of Henry Barclay Swete (Cambridge, 1887–95, 1901, 1909). A detailed description of this edition has been made by H. B. Swete in An Introduction to the Old Testament in Greek (1900), pp. 174–182.
 Grabe's edition was published in Oxford from 1707 to 1720 and reproduced, imperfectly, the Codex Alexandrinus of London. For partial editions, see Fulcran Vigouroux, Dictionnaire de la Bible, 1643 and later.
 Alfred Rahlfs' edition of the Septuagint. Alfred Rahlfs, a Septuagint researcher at the University of Göttingen, began a manual edition of the Septuagint in 1917 or 1918. The completed Septuaginta, published in 1935, relies mainly on the Vaticanus, Sinaiticus and Alexandrinus and presents a critical framework with variants from these and several other sources.
 The Göttingen Septuagint (Vetus Testamentum Graecum: Auctoritate Academiae Scientiarum Gottingensis editum), a critical version in multiple volumes published from 1931 to 2009, is not yet complete; the largest missing parts are the history books Joshua through Chronicles (except Ruth) and the Solomonic books Proverbs through Song of Songs. Its two critical frameworks present variant Septuagint readings and variants of other Greek versions.
 In 2006, a revision of Alfred Rahlfs' Septuaginta was published by the German Bible Society. This revised edition includes over a thousand changes. The text of this revised edition contains changes in the diacritics, and only two wording changes: in Isaiah 5:17 and 53:2, Is 5:17 ἀπειλημμένων became ἀπηλειμμένων, and Is 53:2 ἀνηγγείλαμεν became by conjecture ἀνέτειλε μένà.
 The Apostolic Bible Polyglot contains a Septuagint text derived primarily from the agreement of any two of the Complutensian Polyglot, the Sixtine, and the Aldine texts.
Septuaginta: A Reader's Edition, a 2018 reader's edition of the Septuagint using the text of the 2006 revised edition of Rahlf's Septuaginta.

Onomastics
One of the main challenges, faced by translators during their work, emanated from the need to implement appropriate Greek forms for various onomastic terms, used in the Hebrew Bible. Most onomastic terms (toponyms, anthroponyms) of the Hebrew Bible were rendered by corresponding Greek terms that were similar in form and sounding, with some notable exceptions.

One of those exceptions was related to a specific group of onomastic terms for the region of Aram and ancient Arameans. Influenced by Greek onomastic terminology, translators decided to adopt Greek custom of using "Syrian" labels as designations for Arameans, their lands and language, thus abandoning endonymic (native) terms, that were used in the Hebrew Bible. In the Greek translation, the region of Aram was commonly labeled as "Syria", while Arameans were labeled as "Syrians". Such adoption and implementation of terms that were foreign (exonymic) had far-reaching influence on later terminology related to Arameans and their lands, since the same terminology was reflected in later Latin and other translations of the Septuagint, including the English translation.

Reflecting on those problems, American orientalist Robert W. Rogers (d. 1930) noted in 1921: "it is most unfortunate that Syria and Syrians ever came into the English versions. It should always be Aram and the Aramaeans".

English translations
The first English translation (which excluded the apocrypha) was Charles Thomson's in 1808, which was revised and enlarged by C. A. Muses in 1954 and published by the Falcon's Wing Press.

The Septuagint with Apocrypha: Greek and English was translated by Lancelot Brenton in 1854. It is the traditional translation and most of the time since its publication it has been the only one readily available, and it has continually been in print. The translation, based on the Codex Vaticanus, contains the Greek and English texts in parallel columns. It has an average of four footnoted, transliterated words per page, abbreviated Alex and GK.

The Complete Apostles' Bible (translated by Paul W. Esposito) was published in 2007. Using the Masoretic Text in the 23rd Psalm (and possibly elsewhere), it omits the apocrypha.

A New English Translation of the Septuagint and the Other Greek Translations Traditionally Included Under that Title (NETS), an academic translation based on the New Revised Standard version (in turn based on the Masoretic Text) was published by the International Organization for Septuagint and Cognate Studies (IOSCS) in October 2007.

The Apostolic Bible Polyglot, published in 2003, features a Greek-English interlinear Septuagint. It includes the Greek books of the Hebrew canon (without the apocrypha) and the Greek New Testament; the whole Bible is numerically coded to a new version of the Strong numbering system created to add words not present in the original numbering by Strong. The edition is set in monotonic orthography. The version includes a Bible concordance and index.

The Orthodox Study Bible, published in early 2008, features a new translation of the Septuagint based on the Alfred Rahlfs' edition of the Greek text. Two additional major sources have been added: the 1851 Brenton translation and the New King James Version text in places where the translation matches the Hebrew Masoretic text. This edition includes the NKJV New Testament and extensive commentary from an Eastern Orthodox perspective.

Nicholas King completed The Old Testament in four volumes and The Bible.

Brenton's Septuagint, Restored Names Version (SRNV) has been published in two volumes. The Hebrew-names restoration, based on the Westminster Leningrad Codex, focuses on the restoration of the Divine Name and has extensive Hebrew and Greek footnotes.

The Eastern Orthodox Bible would have featured an extensive revision and correction of Brenton's translation (which was primarily based on the Codex Vaticanus). With modern language and syntax, it would have had extensive introductory material and footnotes with significant inter-LXX and LXX/MT variants, before being cancelled.

The Holy Orthodox Bible by Peter A. Papoutsis and The Old Testament According to the Seventy by Michael Asser are based on the Greek Septuagint text published by the Apostoliki Diakonia of the Church of Greece.

In 2012, Lexham Press published the Lexham English Septuagint (LES), providing a literal, readable, and transparent English edition of the Septuagint for modern readers. In 2019, Lexham Press published the Lexham English Septuagint, Second Edition (LES2), making more of an effort than the first to focus on the text as received rather than as produced. Because this approach shifts the point of reference from a diverse group to a single implied reader, the new LES exhibits more consistency than the first edition. "The Lexham English Septuagint (LES), then, is the only contemporary English translation of the LXX that has been made directly from the Greek."

Society and journal
The International Organization for Septuagint and Cognate Studies (IOSCS), a non-profit learned society, promotes international research into and study of the Septuagint and related texts. The society declared 8 February 2006 International Septuagint Day, a day to promote the work on campuses and in communities. The IOSCS publishes the Journal of Septuagint and Cognate Studies.

See also

 Biblical apocrypha
 Biblical canon
 Book of Job in Byzantine illuminated manuscripts
 Books of the Bible
 Brenton's English Translation of the Septuagint
 Deuterocanonical books
 Documentary hypothesis – Theory that the Torah was composed over a long period by many authors
 La Bible d'Alexandrie
 Samareitikon

Notes

References

Further reading

 Siegfried Kreuzer, ed. Introduction to the Septuagint (Waco, TX: Baylor University Press; 2019) 671 pages; general information on the history and transmission of the Septuagint; information on each book of the Septuagint. 
 Eberhard Bons and Jan Joosten, eds. Septuagint Vocabulary: Pre-History, Usage, Reception (Society of Biblical Literature; 2011) 211 pages; studies of the language used
 Bart D. Ehrman. The New Testament: A Historical Introduction to the Early Christian Writings; 608 pages, Oxford University Press (July, 2011); 
 W. Emery Barnes, On the Influence of Septuagint on the Peshitta, JTS 1901, pp. 186–197.
 
 
 
 Andreas Juckel, Septuaginta and Peshitta Jacob of Edessa quoting the Old Testament in Ms BL Add 17134 JOURNAL OF SYRIAC STUDIES
 Kantor, Mattis, The Jewish time line encyclopedia: A yearby-year history from Creation to the present, Jason Aronson Inc., London, 1992.
 Kreuzer, Siegfried, The Bible in Greek. Translation, Transmission, and Theology of the Septuagint, Septuagint and Cognate Studies 63, Atlanta: SBL Press 2015.
 Timothy Michael Law, When God Spoke Greek, Oxford University Press, 2013.
 Hyam Maccoby. The Mythmaker: Paul and the Invention of Christianity; 238 pages, Barnes & Noble Books (1998); 
 Makrakis, Apostolos, Proofs of the Authenticity of the Septuagint, trans. by D. Cummings, Chicago, Ill.: Hellenic Christian Educational Society, 1947. N.B.: Published and printed with its own pagination, whether as issued separately or as included together with 2 other works of A. Makrakis in a single volume published by the same film in 1950, wherein the translator's name is identified on the common t.p. to that volume.
 
 

 Alfred Rahlfs, Verzeichnis der griechischen Handschriften des Alten Testaments, für das Septuaginta-Unternehmen, Göttingen 1914.
 Rajak, Tessa, Translation and survival: the Greek Bible of the ancient Jewish Diaspora (Oxford; New York: Oxford University Press, 2009).

External links

General
 The Septuagint Online – Comprehensive site with scholarly discussion and links to texts and translations
 The Septuagint Institute
 Jewish Encyclopedia (1906): Bible Translations
 Catholic Encyclopedia (1913): Septuagint Version
 Catholic Encyclopedia (1913): Versions of the Bible
 Codex: Resources and Links Relating to the Septuagint
 Extensive chronological and canonical list of Early Papyri and Manuscripts of the Septuagint
 

Texts and translations
 
 Septuagint/Old Greek Texts and Translations LXX finder, listing dozens of editions, both print and digital, in various languages and formats. A good place to start.
 Elpenor's Bilingual (Greek/English) Septuagint Old Testament Greek text (full polytonic unicode version) and English translation side by side. Greek text as used by the Orthodox Churches.
 Titus Text Collection: Vetus Testamentum graece iuxta LXX interpretes (advanced research tool)
 Septuagint published by the Church of Greece
 text of the whole LXX
 Bible Resource Pages – contains Septuagint texts (with diacritics) side-by-side with English translations
 The Septuagint in Greek as a Microsoft Word document. Introduction and book abbreviations in Latin. Non-free Antioch (Vusillus Old Face, Vusillus) TrueType font file required.
 New English Translation of the Septuagint (NETS), electronic edition
 Eastern/Greek Orthodox Bible: includes comprehensive introductory materials dealing with Septuagintal issues and an Old Testament which is an extensive revision of the Brenton with footnotes.
 Holy Orthodox Bible translated by Peter A. Papoutsis  from the Septuagint (LXX) and the Official Greek New Testament text of the Ecumenical Patriarch.
 LXX2012: Septuagint in American English 2012 – The Septuagint with Apocrypha, translated from Greek to English by Sir Lancelot C. L. Brenton and published in 1885, with some language updates by Michael Paul Johnson in 2012 (American English)

The LXX and the NT
 Septuagint references in NT by John Salza
 An Apology for the Septuagint – by Edward William Grinfield

Septuagint
Early versions of the Bible
Hebrew Bible versions and translations
Hellenism and Christianity
Judaism-related controversies